Harry Theophilus Toulmin (March 4, 1838 – November 12, 1916) was a United States district judge of the United States District Court for the Southern District of Alabama.

Education and career

Born in Mobile County, Alabama, Toulmin read law to enter the bar in 1860. He was in private practice in Mobile, Alabama in 1860. He was a Confederate States Army Colonel from 1861 to 1865, then resumed private practice in Mobile. He was a member of the Alabama House of Representatives from 1870 to 1872. He was a Judge of the 6th Judicial Circuit of Alabama from 1874 to 1880, then  a Judge of the 1st Judicial Circuit of Alabama from 1880 to 1882, the change due to realignment of the circuits.

Federal judicial service

Toulmin was nominated by President Grover Cleveland on December 13, 1886, to the United States District Court for the Southern District of Alabama, to a new seat authorized by 24 Stat. 213. He was confirmed by the United States Senate on January 13, 1887, and received his commission the same day. His service terminated on November 12, 1916, due to his death in Toulminville, Alabama.

References

Sources
 

1838 births
1916 deaths
Alabama lawyers
Alabama state court judges
Confederate States Army officers
Judges of the United States District Court for the Southern District of Alabama
Members of the Alabama House of Representatives
People of Alabama in the American Civil War
People from Mobile County, Alabama
United States federal judges appointed by Grover Cleveland
19th-century American judges
United States federal judges admitted to the practice of law by reading law